Varden is a local newspaper published in Skien, Norway.

History and profile
The newspaper was first established with a test issue on 17 December 1874, with Johan Christian Tandberg Castberg as its first editor-in-chief. It has been published daily since 1895, and in the tabloid format since 2001 Its current editor-in-chief is Lars Kise, who took over from Per Valebrokk in 2008.

Originally, Varden was owned by individual persons. Harald Kristoffersen, its editor-in-chief and owner from 1901, created the limited company AS Varden in 1918. The corporation Orkla Media, later renamed Edda Media, bought the newspaper in 1994, and still has a 100% ownership. Through the publishing company Varden AS, Varden itself has a 100% ownership of the smaller newspapers Kanalen (published in Nome), Kragerø Blad Vestmar (Kragerø) and Telen (Notodden). Varden itself has local offices both in Kragerø and Notodden, as well as in Bamble, Porsgrunn, Kviteseid, Bø and Rjukan.

The leading newspaper in Telemark county for many years, Varden was surpassed by Telemark Arbeiderblad in 1974, only to regain the number one spot in 1988. Telemark Arbeiderblad was later renamed Telemarksavisa, and had a circulation of 22,346.

At the time Varden was established, newspapers in Norway had close ties with political parties. Varden was special in that it changed political allegiance from Liberal to Conservative, in 1953. The ties between political parties and newspapers no longer exist. Today, the newspaper classifies itself as an "independent" newspaper which works to promote a liberal and democratic society with respect for individual rights, social fairness and free enterprise.

Varden had a circulation of 27,341 and 25,859 subscribers.

References

1874 establishments in Norway
Newspapers established in 1874
Daily newspapers published in Norway
Norwegian-language newspapers
Liberal Party (Norway) newspapers
Conservative Party (Norway) newspapers
Mass media in Skien